Yohanna Petros Mouche (born November 23, 1943) is an Iraqi Syriac Catholic prelate. He serves as the Archbishop of Mosul.

Early life
Yohanna Petros Mouche was born on November 23, 1943 in Bakhdida, Nineveh Governorate, Iraq. He was ordained as a priest on June 6, 1968.

Career
Mouche was elected as the Archbishop of Mosul in 2011.

In August 2011, he blamed the bombing of the Holy Family Church in Kirkuk on government infighting, concluding that officials were too busy arguing among themselves to keep the country safe.

In August 2014, he visited Christian refugees in Soran, Kurdistan

References

Living people
1943 births
People from Bakhdida
Iraqi Eastern Catholics
Syriac Catholic clergy
Iraqi archbishops
20th-century Eastern Catholic archbishops
21st-century Eastern Catholic archbishops